Pleasanton is a city in Alameda County, California, United States. Located in the Amador Valley, it is a suburb in the East Bay region of the San Francisco Bay Area. The population was 79,871 at the 2020 census. In 2005 and 2007, Pleasanton was ranked the wealthiest middle-sized city in the United States by the Census Bureau. Pleasanton is home to the headquarters of Safeway, Workday, Ellie Mae, Roche Molecular Diagnostics, Blackhawk Network Holdings, and Veeva Systems. Other major employers include Kaiser Permanente, Oracle and Macy's. Although Oakland is the Alameda County seat, a few county offices are located in Pleasanton. The Alameda County Fairgrounds are located in Pleasanton, where the county fair is held during the last week of June and the first week of July. Pleasanton Ridge Regional Park is located on the west side of town.

History

Alisal 
Before the establishment of Pleasanton in the 1850s, an earlier settlement in the location was called Alisal. It was located on the lands of the Rancho Santa Rita near the site of an Indian ranchera, around the Francisco Solano Alviso Adobe, called El Alisal (The Sycamores), one of the earliest houses built in the valley in 1844. It is still standing and serves as the centerpiece of the Alviso Adobe Community Park. Alisal, nicknamed "The Most Desperate Town in the West", was one of the settlements located along La Vereda del Monte that was a haunt and refuge of bandits and desperados in the era following the beginning of the California Gold Rush. Main Street shootouts were not uncommon. Banditos such as Claudio Feliz and Joaquin Murrieta would ambush prospectors on their way back from the gold rush fields and then seek refuge in Alisal. In the 1860s Procopio, Narciso Bojorques and others took refuge there.

Pleasanton 
Pleasanton is located on the lands of the Rancho Valle de San José and Rancho Santa Rita Mexican land grants. Its name was chosen in the 1860s by John W. Kottinger, an Alameda County justice of the peace, after his friend, Union army cavalry Major General Alfred Pleasonton. A typographical error by a recording clerk in Washington, D.C., apparently led to the current spelling.

In 1917, Pleasanton was the backdrop for the film Rebecca of Sunnybrook Farm, starring Mary Pickford. The town was once home to Phoebe Apperson Hearst, who lived in a 50-room mansion on a  estate, now the site of Castlewood Country Club.

Radum Plant was a sand and gravel plant opened in 1931 by Henry J. Kaiser Co., at Radum train station, one mile east of Pleasanton.

Geography
Pleasanton is adjacent to Hayward, Livermore, and Dublin. On the east side of town on Stanley Blvd. near the Livermore border is Shadow Cliffs Regional Park, a lake that permits swimming, fishing, and boating. On the west side is the Pleasanton Ridge with two parks, Pleasanton Ridge and Augustin Bernal Park. Much of Pleasanton is drained by the Arroyo Valle and Arroyo Mocho watercourses. Pleasanton lies along the route of the historic First transcontinental railroad.

Climate
Pleasanton features a Mediterranean climate, featuring hot, dry summers and mild to cool winters with occasional rainfall (Köppen climate classification Csa). The highest recorded temperature was 115 °F (46 °C) in 1950. The lowest recorded temperature was 17 °F (−8 °C) in 1990.

Demographics

2020
The 2020 United States Census reported that Pleasanton had a population of 79,871. The racial makeup of Pleasanton was 47,058 (67.0%) White, 1,190 (1.7%) African American, 226 (0.3%) Native American, 16,322 (23.2%) Asian, 134 (0.2%) Pacific Islander, 2,002 (2.8%) from other races, and 3,353 (4.8%) from two or more races. Hispanic or Latino of any race were 7,264 persons (10.3%).

The Census reported that 69,829 people (99.4% of the population) lived in households, 320 (0.5%) lived in non-institutionalized group quarters, and 136 (0.2%) were institutionalized.

There were 25,245 households, out of which 10,785 (42.7%) had children under the age of 18 living in them, 16,206 (64.2%) were opposite-sex married couples living together, 2,024 (8.0%) had a female householder with no husband present, 948 (3.8%) had a male householder with no wife present. There were 887 (3.5%) unmarried opposite-sex partnerships, and 156 (0.6%) same-sex married couples or partnerships. Of the households, 4,860 (19.3%) were made up of individuals, and 1,853 (7.3%) had someone living alone who was 65 years of age or older. The average household size was 2.77. There were 19,178 families (76.0% of all households); the average family size was 3.20.

The population was spread out, with 19,024 people (27.1%) under the age of 18, 4,378 people (6.2%) aged 18 to 24, 17,257 people (24.6%) aged 25 to 44, 21,965 people (31.3%) aged 45 to 64, and 7,661 people (10.9%) who were 65 years of age or older. The median age was 40.5 years. For every 100 females, there were 96.1 males. For every 100 females age 18 and over, there were 93.0 males.

The homeowner vacancy rate was 0.9%; the rental vacancy rate was 4.1%. 51,839 people (73.8% of the population) lived in owner-occupied housing units and 17,990 people (25.6%) lived in rental housing units.

Economy

Pleasanton experienced a major economic boom starting in the early 1980s, largely associated with the development of a number of business parks, the largest of which is the Hacienda Business Park. These host a number of campus-like clusters of low-rise and medium-rise office buildings. Pleasanton has been successful in attracting a number of corporate headquarters, such as those of Safeway, Blackhawk Network Holdings, Workday, Simpson Manufacturing, The Cooper Companies and Shaklee. Despite an increase in office space vacancy rates in 2000–2004, economic development has remained strong through the middle of the decade.

Pleasanton was also the headquarters of the former PeopleSoft, Inc. (which was acquired by Oracle Corporation), Documentum (which was acquired by EMC Corporation), Thoratec (now part of Abbott), E-Loan (which was acquired by Popular), Spreckels Sugar Company (which was acquired by Imperial Holly), Ross Stores (which moved to nearby Dublin in 2014), Patelco Credit Union (also moved to Dublin) and the home loan operation of Providian (which was acquired by Washington Mutual, itself later acquired by JPMorgan Chase). Oracle occupies two buildings of the former PeopleSoft campus, and is the fourth-largest employer in Pleasanton, behind Workday, Safeway and Kaiser Permanente. In addition, Pleasanton is the site of a large AT&T campus.

Other companies with major operations in Pleasanton include Hitachi High Technologies America, Inc., Cisco Systems, QASource, Sage Software (Accpac, etc.), CooperVision, Clorox, Fireside Bank (closed in 2012), Roche, BMC Software, Zoho Corporation,  Applied Biosystems, EMC Corporation, Portrait Displays, Inc. and Broadcom Inc.

In retail operations, Pleasanton has one major regional mall (Stoneridge Shopping Center) and a number of other shopping centers. Besides the anchor tenants Macy's and JC Penney at Stoneridge, notable large stores elsewhere in the city include Home Depot, Wal-Mart, and Kohl's.

In addition to the business parks and retail centers, Pleasanton is known for its lively downtown, which is home to a number of fine-dining, casual, and ethnic restaurants, specialty retailers, and service businesses. A redesign of Main Street in the 1990s emphasized pedestrian traffic and outdoor dining.

In 2005, the median household income in Pleasanton was $101,022, the highest income for any city with a population between 65,000 and 249,999 people. Similarly, for 2007, the median household income rose to $113,345, also the highest in the category. According to City-Data.com, the median household income had risen to $121,622 by 2013, compared to a statewide median of $60,190.

According to the Bay East Association of Realtors, the median price of a detached single family home was $1,795,000 as of August 2021. According to Zillow.com, the median home value in Pleasanton was $1,500,415 as of September 2021.

Top employers

According to the city, as of June 2022 the top fifteen employers in Pleasanton are:

*Headquartered in Pleasanton

Arts and culture

Events and festivals
Pleasanton maintains regular events for the community. Every Saturday morning a farmers' market sets up on Angela, off Main Street. There are several parades during the year, commemorating Christmas, Memorial Day, and Veterans Day, as well as kicking off the beginning of the Alameda County Fair and soccer season.

First Wednesday
Beginning in the late 1990s, the Pleasanton Downtown Association organized the popular First Wednesday celebrations from May through September of each year. On the first Wednesday of summer months, Main Street was blocked to traffic and adopted a street fair atmosphere. Each First Wednesday celebration was given a theme and planned with related activities. At this local event, businesses and organizations from downtown and around the Tri-Valley set up booths in the center of the street. A local band performed in the Inklings coffee house parking lot, which was closed off for dancing. The parking lot was also set up as a beergarden, with beer and wine available for consumption. In 2017, the association announced it was discontinuing the events, and was considering other types of events in future years.

Friday Concerts in the Park
Another Pleasanton Downtown Association tradition is the Friday Concerts in the Park series. Every Friday from June until September the PDA schedules different local bands to perform in the evenings at the Lions' Wayside Park off of First Street. The events are free of charge and draw a crowd. Additional seating for 'Concerts in the Park' is available at Delucchi Park, at the intersection of First Street and Neal Street.

Fairgrounds
The Alameda County Fairgrounds is a  facility located in Pleasanton. It is home to the annual Alameda County Fair, held since 1912, as well as numerous trade shows and community events including but not limited to the Scottish Games which occur annually on Labor Day weekend.   Located on its grounds, the Pleasanton Fairgrounds Racetrack was built in 1858, making it the oldest  horse racing track in the United States. There is a 3,000 seat amphitheater, as well as a nine-hole golf course located within the track's infield.

The Alameda County Central Railroad Society has maintained a model train exhibit at the fairgrounds since 1959.

Firehouse Arts Center
The Firehouse Arts Center, opened in 2010, is a center of culture and art for Pleasanton. It features a 221-seat theater, the Harrington art gallery, and classrooms for art and drama.

Hacienda del Pozo de Verona

Hacienda del Pozo de Verona (The House of the Wellhead of Verona) was destroyed in a fire in 1969. The house was built by architect A. C. Schweinfurth for Phoebe Hearst in 1898.

Government

Local 
Pleasanton operates under a council–manager form of municipal government. The council consists of four elected at-large representatives and one directly elected mayor. The councilors are each elected to a four-year term, while the mayor serves a two-year term. Council and mayoral elections are non-partisan. Starting in 2022, Council elections are divided into 4 different municipal districts. The vice mayor is appointed each calendar year by the mayor. The mayor and council members are limited to a maximum term of eight years.

The city council consists of: Karla Brown (mayor), Valerie Arkin, Jack Balch, Kathy Narum, and Julie Testa. The city manager is Gerry Beaudin.

State and Federal 

Pleasanton has 44,099 registered voters with 17,021 (39.2%) registered as Democrats, 11,338 (25.7%) registered as Republicans, and 13,867 (31.4%) Decline to State voters.

Education

In the majority of Pleasanton, the public schools are part of the Pleasanton Unified School District. Pleasanton USD formed in 1988 when the school districts of Pleasanton and Dublin unified along city lines. A very small portion of Pleasanton is in the Livermore Valley Joint Unified School District.

Pleasanton's two comprehensive high schools, Amador Valley and Foothill, are ranked by Niche among the top 200 public high schools in the nation. Pleasanton also has a Continuation high school,  Village High School. As of 2021, the district also contained three middle schools, nine elementary schools, one preschool, and an adult education program.

Media
The Pleasanton Weekly is a local newspaper. Tri-Valley Community Television operates their sole station in Pleasanton.

Transportation

Roads 
Pleasanton is situated at the crossroads of two major Interstate Highways, I-580 and I-680, which mirror the historic cross-routes of Native American tribes who used the precursor paths as major trading routes. This fact was first discovered with the excavations for Hacienda Business Park, revealing significant tribal artifacts and human skeletal remains.

Public transit 
The city is served by two stations on the Bay Area Rapid Transit (BART) heavy rail system's Dublin/Pleasanton–Daly City line, which runs along the northern boundary of the city:
 Dublin/Pleasanton (BART station), the eastern terminus.
 West Dublin/Pleasanton, located just west of the I-680 interchange by the Stoneridge Mall.

The Altamont Corridor Express rail service stops near Pleasanton's downtown at Pleasanton Station.

The Wheels (LAVTA) bus transit system is the primary provider of bus service in Pleasanton (with numerous routes in the city), and connects Pleasanton to Livermore and Dublin, along with the above three stations.

Express routes from Pleasanton Station and Dublin/Pleasanton (BART station) to San Ramon and Walnut Creek are provided by County Connection.

Airports 
Pleasanton's closest airport is Livermore Municipal Airport, which is primarily used for general aviation and charter flights; there is no regularly-scheduled commercial service. The closest commercial airports are San Jose International Airport, which is reachable by the Altamont Corridor Express, and Oakland International Airport, which can be reached directly through BART. The vast majority of international flights serving the region operate from San Francisco International Airport, also accessible via BART.

Notable people
People from Pleasanton include:
 Scott Adams, cartoonist, creator of Dilbert
Brandon Crawford, professional baseball player for the San Francisco Giants
 Paula Creamer, professional golfer
 T. J. Friedl, professional baseball player
 David Garibaldi, professional drummer with Tower of Power, 2012 Percussive Arts Society Hall of Fame Inductee, author of numerous drum instructional books, CDs and DVDs
 Edwin Hawkins, gospel musician, pianist, choir master, composer and arranger
 Phoebe Hearst, philanthropist, feminist and suffragist, mother of William Randolph Hearst
Walter S. Johnson, businessman and philanthropist
 Randal J. Kirk, businessman
 Joel Kribel, professional golfer
John Madden, football coach and sportscaster
 Sean Mannion, former quarterback for the Los Angeles Rams
 Abby Martin, journalist and host of Breaking the Set
 Keith Millard, former NFL defensive tackle
 Jerry McNerney, US Congressman
 William E. Moerner, 2014 Nobel Prize laureate in chemistry
 Jim Perry, game show host, specifically for game shows Card Sharks and Sale of the Century
 Scott Perry, professional football player
  Stephen Piscotty, professional baseball player for the Oakland Athletics
 Dennis Richmond, former news anchor for KTVU
 Ryan Roxie, Singer/songwriter and guitarist for Alice Cooper, Casablanca and Slash's Snakepit.
 Tamriko Siprashvili, prize-winning international concert pianist, recording artist, instructor
Ellen Tauscher, former Congresswoman for California's 10th congressional district
 Donna Theodore, singer and actress
 Gabrielle Union, film and television actress
 David Yost, Mighty Morphin Power Rangers actor.

Sister cities

  Blairgowrie and Rattray, Scotland, UK
  Fergus, Ontario, Canada
  Tulancingo, Mexico

See also

 Bernal Subbasin
 Livermore-Pleasanton Fire Department
 Pleasanton Fault
 Pleasanton Public Library

References

Further reading

External links

 

 
1894 establishments in California
Cities in Alameda County, California
Cities in the San Francisco Bay Area
Incorporated cities and towns in California
Amador Valley
Populated places established in 1894